Jay Lelliott (born 1 February 1995) is an English freestyle swimmer who won a bronze medal in the 400 m event at the 2014 European Aquatics Championships.

Lelliott started swimming competitively aged 11, inspired by Michael Phelps. In 2007 and 2008 he underwent surgical operations due to a brain tumour. He was part of the 2012 Summer Olympics torch relay.

References 

1995 births
Living people
Sportspeople from Dorchester, Dorset
English male freestyle swimmers
Universiade medalists in swimming
Universiade gold medalists for Great Britain
Universiade silver medalists for Great Britain
Medalists at the 2015 Summer Universiade
Medalists at the 2017 Summer Universiade
Swimmers at the 2014 Commonwealth Games
Swimmers at the 2022 Commonwealth Games
Commonwealth Games competitors for England